Rupert Vance Hartke (May 31, 1919July 27, 2003) was an American politician who served as a Democratic United States Senator from Indiana from 1959 until 1977. Hartke won election to the Senate after serving as the mayor of Evansville, Indiana. In the Senate, he supported the Great Society and became a prominent opponent of the Vietnam War. Hartke ran for president in the 1972 Democratic primaries but withdrew after the first set of primaries. He left the Senate after being defeated in his 1976 re-election campaign by Richard Lugar.

Early life, education, military service
Hartke was born on May 31, 1919, in Stendal, Indiana, the son of Ida Mary (Egbert), an organist, and Hugo Leonard Hartke, a teacher. His paternal grandparents were German, as were all of his maternal great-grandparents. He attended public schools in Stendal. He graduated from Evansville College (now the University of Evansville) in 1940, and from 1942 until 1946 Hartke served in the United States Navy and United States Coast Guard, rising from seaman to lieutenant. Hartke graduated from the Indiana University Maurer School of Law in 1948.

Legal and political career
After joining the Indiana State Bar in 1948, Hartke began practicing law in Evansville. He also worked as deputy prosecuting attorney of Vanderburgh County (1950–1951) and Mayor of Evansville (1956–1958) and integrated the city swimming pools before being elected to the United States Senate in 1958 and reelected in 1964 and 1970 (1959–1977).

Senate service and later life

In the Senate, Hartke was best known for his opposition to the Vietnam War and his chairmanship of the Senate Veterans Affairs Committee. Hartke had a fallout with President Lyndon Johnson when he became one of the first opponents of the Vietnam War.

Hartke was elected to the Senate in 1958 at age 39, defeating Republican Governor Harold Handley. He became known as a hard-working, liberal Democrat with a strong relationship with Senate Majority Leader Lyndon Johnson. In his first term, Hartke was a member of the Finance and Commerce committees. During his first term, Hartke lobbied for programs like Medicare and Medicaid, and supported the Civil Rights Act of 1964.

Hartke was re-elected over state Senator Russell Bontrager in 1964, becoming only the third Indiana Democrat, after Benjamin Franklin Shively in 1914 and Frederick Van Nuys in 1938, to be popularly elected to a second term in the Senate. He helped create student loan programs and new veterans benefits during his second term. He helped to establish Amtrak as chairman of the Subcommittee on Surface Transportation.

After his sister, Ruth E. Hartke, was killed in a head-on crash in Ohio (2 Sep 1964) while working his campaign, Hartke used his chairmanship of Commerce Transportation Subcommittee to make automakers equip cars with seat belts and other safety equipment. He also was instrumental in creating the International Executive Service Corps, an organization, modeled after the Peace Corps that sent retired U.S. businessmen to poor countries to help turn small businesses into larger ones.

Hartke was credited with important roles in the passage of measures that created or supported student loan programs, veterans' benefits and the Head Start Program. He also developed an organization modeled on the Peace Corps that helped small overseas businesses. Senator Hartke introduced a bill to create the George Washington Peace Academy and a Department of Peace. The concept became known as the first cornerstone for the campaign that led to the creation of the U.S. Institute of Peace.

Hartke was praised for winning passage of a measure making kidney dialysis more widely available. A statement entered into the Congressional Record in honor of his 80th birthday credited the measure with saving 500,000 lives.

His opposition to the Vietnam War was not popular in Indiana. In 1970, after a very bitter and tight race against Republican Congressman Richard L. Roudebush and a ballot recount, Hartke won a third term by 4,200 votes. In 1972, Hartke was an unsuccessful candidate for the Democratic Party's presidential nomination against fellow Senators Edmund Muskie and George McGovern. Four years later, after narrowly surviving a primary challenge by freshman Eighth District Congressman Philip Hayes, Hartke was defeated for reelection by Indianapolis Mayor Richard Lugar in a landslide. Until the election of Joe Donnelly in 2012, Hartke was the most recent Indiana Democrat, aside from a member of the Bayh family, to have won and served in the Senate.

In 1994, Hartke pleaded guilty to a misdemeanor election fraud charge in southeastern Indiana's Dearborn County.  At the previous November's general election, a Kentucky-based casino firm had employed him as a consultant to support them during a casino-legalization referendum.

Hartke wrote three books — The American Crisis in Vietnam, You and Your Senator and Inside the New Frontier , the last co-authored with John M. Redding.

Personal life and death
Hartke and his wife, Martha, had seven children. Their daughter, Anita Hartke, was the 2008 Democratic candidate for the United States House of Representatives from the 7th congressional district of Virginia. She lost to the Republican incumbent, Eric Cantor.

Hartke died at a hospital in Fairfax, Virginia on July 27, 2003, aged 84.

Posthumous award
In 2009 the JFK Club of Vanderburgh County awarded the John F. Kennedy Profiles in Courage Posthumous Award to Senator Vance Hartke. To carry forward the legacy and principles of President John F. Kennedy by supporting legislation and government officials or candidates that promote social justice and equality, in order to build a better community and society for all.

Electoral history

References

External links

1919 births
2003 deaths
20th-century American lawyers
20th-century American male writers
20th-century American non-fiction writers
20th-century American politicians
21st-century American lawyers
American Lutherans
American male non-fiction writers
American people of German descent
American political writers
Burials at Arlington National Cemetery
Candidates in the 1972 United States presidential election
Democratic Party United States senators from Indiana
Indiana Democrats
Indiana University Maurer School of Law alumni
Indiana lawyers
Mayors of Evansville, Indiana
Military personnel from Indiana
People from Pike County, Indiana
Politicians from Falls Church, Virginia
United States Coast Guard officers
United States Coast Guard personnel of World War II
United States Navy personnel of World War II
United States Navy sailors
University of Evansville alumni
Writers from Evansville, Indiana